A Tapchan is a type of outdoor furniture unique to Central Asia especially Tajikistan and Uzbekistan, combining a large bed capable of holding 4-8 adults with a table at which meals can be eaten.. It is similar or identical to the Malay bale-bale, 'wooden raised platform'.

Variants
Although typically an outdoor fixture, they are also found indoors, for instance at roadside restaurants, since they allow the customer to both rest and eat. Private homes with a tapchan in the yard often build canopy posts with either a fixed shade or curtains.

External links
 A custom-built tapchan in North America

Footnotes

Central Asia
Tajikistani design
Tables (furniture)
Beds